This is a list of coaches and captains of the Fitzroy Football Club, along with best and fairest award winners and leading goalkickers, for every year of the club's participation in the Victorian Football Association, the Victorian/Australian Football League and the Victorian Amateur Football Association.

From 1987 to 1996, Fitzroy's best and fairest award was known as the Mitchell Medal, named after Percy Mitchell, a long-serving club administrator and life member.

Victorian Football Association

1884–1896

Victorian/Australian Football League

1897–1909

1910–1919

1920–1929

1930–1939

1940–1949

1950–1959

1960–1969

1970–1979

1980–1989

1990–1996

Victorian Amateur Football Association

2009–2012

Notes

References 
Dom has footy flourishing in the jungle. (2005, June). The Lions Tale, p. 14

External links
Fitzroy Honour Roll at FootyStats

Honour Roll
Australian rules football records and statistics
Australian rules football-related lists